The Stroud and District Combination Bill Adams Cup is an annual rugby union knock-out club competition organised by the Stroud and District Combination – one of the five bodies that make up the Gloucestershire Rugby Football Union.  It was first introduced during the 1983–84 season, with the first ever winners being Cirencester III.  The Bill Adams Cup is the third most important cup competition in Stroud District behind the Senior Cup (1st) and Stroud and District Combination Junior Cup (2nd).  With only 9 member clubs the combination is one of the smallest in Gloucestershire.

The Bill Adams Cup is currently open to the 2nd and 3rd teams of clubs location within the Stroud District.  The format is a knock-out cup with semi-finals and a final, with the final to be held a neutral ground between March–May.

Stroud and District Combination Bill Adams Cup winners

Number of wins
Cirencester III (15)
Dursley III (12)
Minchinhampton II (2)
Cainscross III (1)
Fairford II (1)
Painswick III (1)
Royal Agricultural College III (1)
Tetbury II (1)
Wotton-under-Edge II (1)

Notes

See also
 Gloucestershire RFU
 Stroud & District Combination Senior Cup
 Stroud & District Combination Junior Cup
 English rugby union system
 Rugby union in England

References

External links
 Gloucestershire RFU

Recurring sporting events established in 1983
1983 establishments in England
Rugby union cup competitions in England
Rugby union in Gloucestershire